Kiko García (born 25 August 1968) is a Spanish former cyclist. He competed in the individual road race at the 1992 Summer Olympics, finishing in 24th place.

Major results

1989
 1st Overall Clásica de Alcobendas
1992
 1st Overall Clásica de Alcobendas
1993
 2nd Overall Vuelta a La Rioja
1st Stage 1
1996
 2nd Clásica de Sabiñánigo

References

External links
 

1968 births
Living people
Spanish male cyclists
Olympic cyclists of Spain
Cyclists at the 1992 Summer Olympics
People from Courbevoie
Sportspeople from Hauts-de-Seine
Cyclists from the Valencian Community
Cyclists from Île-de-France